The Design 1014 ship (full name Emergency Fleet Corporation Design 1014) was a steel-hulled cargo ship design approved for production by the United States Shipping Boards Emergency Fleet Corporation (EFT) in World War I. They were referred to as the "Cascade"-type. They were all built by Todd Drydock and Construction Company, at their Tacoma, Washington shipyard. 20 ships were completed for the USSB in 1919 and 1920; and additional 2 were completed in 1920 for private companies. 12 ships were cancelled.

References

Bibliography

External links
 EFC Design 1014: Illustrations

Standard ship types of the United States